Tropidophorus mocquardii  is a species of skink found in Malaysia.

References

mocquardii
Reptiles of Malaysia
Reptiles described in 1895
Taxa named by George Albert Boulenger
Reptiles of Borneo